The following elections occurred in the year 1831.

North America

United States
 United States Senate election in New York, 1831

South America
 1831 Chilean presidential election

Europe
 1831 French legislative election
 1830–1831 papal conclave

United Kingdom
 1831 United Kingdom general election

See also
 :Category:1831 elections

1831
Elections